22, A Million is the third studio album by American indie folk band Bon Iver, released on September 30, 2016. Recorded in lead member Justin Vernon's April Base studio in Eau Claire, Wisconsin, the album marks a major shift in the band's sound and incorporates elements of electronic music and hip hop production influenced by Vernon's prior work with Kanye West. Most of the lyricism concerns Bon Iver's rise in popularity and how Vernon's relationship with the world has changed as a result.

22, A Million first premiered at Vernon's Eaux Claires Music Festival, and upon release the album debuted at number 2 on the Billboard 200, receiving widespread acclaim from critics who praised its original sound and colorful lyricism. Several publications, including Pitchfork, Rolling Stone and The Guardian, listed 22, A Million as one of the best albums of 2016. It also received nominations for Best Alternative Music Album and Best Recording Package at the 2017 Grammy Awards. In 2019, Pitchfork and Rolling Stone included it in their list of best albums of the decade, at number 91 and 47, respectively.

Background
22, A Million is composed of songs written and produced from 2012 to 2016. It makes extensive use of samples, synths and brass instruments. Many of the sounds on the record were created and manipulated using a Teenage Engineering OP-1 synthesizer, along with a harmonizer designed for the band by engineer and producer Chris Messina.

Critical reception

22, A Million received acclaim from critics, garnering a score of 87 out of 100 on Metacritic, signifying "universal acclaim" based on 41 critic reviews. Writing for Pretty Much Amazing, Peter Tabakis praised the album in his review, giving it an A, and remarking, "Not since Kid A has an album so superb pushed away and pulled closer its audience, simultaneously and with such aplomb." In his review for Rolling Stone, Will Hermes opined, "Vernon remains an oblique lyricist, but the knottiness can be compelling." It gave it four stars out of five. Paul Bridgewater of The Line of Best Fit awarded the record full marks, writing that "22, A Million captures personal crisis and resolution better than any album this century". Writing for No Depression, John Amen commented that 22, A Million "integrates the high points of Bon Iver’s first three recordings ... his most focused and ambitious permutation to date."

Accolades

Commercial performance 
22, A Million debuted at number two on the Billboard 200 with 71,000 units, of which 58,000 were traditional album sales. It was the highest-selling album of the week.

Track listing 

Sample credits
 "22 (OVER S∞∞N)" contains a sample of "How I Got Over (Live)", as written by Clara Ward and performed by Mahalia Jackson.
 "10 d E A T h b R E a s T ⚄ ⚄" contains a sample of "Wild Heart", as written and performed by Stevie Nicks.
 "33 "GOD"" contains samples of "Dsharpg", as written and performed by Sharon Van Etten, "Morning", as written by Willis S. Graham and performed by Jim Ed Brown, "Iron Sky", as written by Paolo Nutini and Dani Castelar and performed by Paolo Nutini, and "All Rendered Truth", as written and performed by Lonnie Holley.
 "666 ʇ" contains a sample of "Standing in the Need of Prayer", as written by Dave Kingsby and performed by The Supreme Jubilees.
 "21 M◊◊N WATER" contains samples of "A Lover's Concerto", as written by Denny Randell and Sandy Linzer, and performed by The Toys.
 "00000 Million" contains a sample of "Abacus" as written and performed by Fionn Regan.

Personnel 

 Justin Vernon – "Maker", OP-1, guitar, Prophet, bass guitar, drums, M1, Messina
 Chris Messina – "Maker's Maker"
 BJ Burton – "Noble Black Eagle", C1 programming (track 6), C2 programming (track 6), saxophone (track 7), programming (track 8)
 Ryan Olson – "Scream Defence", MIDI capture piano (track 1), sampler (track 7), field recorder (track 7)
 Camilla Stavely Taylor – "Trust Ear", voices (track 7)
 Brad Cook – "Wings"
 Zach Hanson – "Professional Mixer"
 Mike Perry – "Neighbour"
 Andra Chumas – "Mother Nourishment"
 Rob Moose – "The Whisperer", violins arrangement (track 1), violas arrangement (track 1), saxophones arrangement (tracks 2, 5, 6, 8)
 Cherie Minske – "Rookie"
 Jack – "The Prospector"
 Michael Lewis – "The Oracle", saxophones (tracks 1, 6, 7, 8), Messina (track 9)
 Drew – "Key's Grip"
 Sad Sax of Shit – saxophones 
Al Falaschi
Anthony Barba
Christopher Thomas
Clay Lyons
Clay Pufahl
Dustin Laurenzi
Mark Henderson
Matt Douglas
Nelson Devereaux
Peterson Ross
Scott Fultz
Michael Lewis
 Andy Fitzpatrick – the 22000 (tracks 2, 7, 8), OP-1 (track 6)
 Joe "Squints" Westerlund – bowed cymbals (track 4)
 Trever Hagen – prepared trumpet (track 4)
 Chris Rosenau – electric and acoustic guitars (track 4)
 James Buckley – bass guitars (track 6)
 Sean Carey – drums (tracks 6, 8), percussion (track 6), DX7 (track 7)
 Matt McCaughan – metal drum (track 6), drums (track 8)
 Andrew Broder – V3 programming (track 6), audible programming (track 9)
 Jessica Stavely Taylor – voices (track 7)
 Elise Carey – voices (track 7)
 Colin Stetson – saxophones (track 8)
 Michael Vincent Vognar Noyce – voice (track 8)
 Huntley Miller – mastering
 Eric Timothy Carlson – art

Charts

Weekly charts

Year-end charts

Certifications

References

2016 albums
Bon Iver albums
Folktronica albums
Jagjaguwar albums
Albums produced by Justin Vernon